Caerphilly Golf Club (Welsh: Clwb Golff Caerffili) is a golf club based just outside Caerphilly at Caerphilly County Borough, Wales. A 5944-yard-long, 18 hole Mountain course with par 71 and SSS of 70. The club was founded in  1905".

References

Caerphilly
Golf clubs and courses in Wales
Golf club
1905 establishments in Wales